Mostly 4 Millennials is an American comedy television series on Adult Swim. The series, a satirical look at the Millennial generation, was created and directed by comedian Derrick Beckles and is written and executive produced by Beckles and Eric André. Beckles formerly created the pilot Totally for Teens for Adult Swim in 2009 and the series Hot Package, which aired from 2013 to 2015. Mostly 4 Millennials premiered on July 2, 2018. The show is produced by Factual Productions, Inc.

Episodes

References
Informational notes

Citations

External links

Official website

2018 American television series debuts
2018 American television series endings
2010s American parody television series
2010s American satirical television series
2010s American sketch comedy television series
2010s American surreal comedy television series
2010s American television talk shows
2010s American variety television series
Adult Swim original programming
English-language television shows
Television series by Williams Street